William Geiger was the head football coach for the Rensselaer Polytechnic Institute Engineers football team in 1908 and 1909. He compiled a record of 9–5–1.

Head coaching record

References

Year of birth missing
Year of death missing
RPI Engineers football coaches